National Tertiary Route 746, or just Route 746 (or ) is a National Road Route of Costa Rica, located in the Alajuela province.

Description
This route is an almost straight west to east road between two other national routes.

In Alajuela province the route covers San Carlos canton (Pital district).

Junction list
The entire route is in Pital district.

References

Highways in Costa Rica